Clark Mountain is a mountain located in the Clark Mountain Range in the Mojave National Preserve, close to the California-Nevada border.

Geography

Path 46 and Path 64 (part of Path 46) 500 kV power lines run to the north and south of the mountain, respectively.

Ecology
The higher elevations of the mountain are a striking sky island contrast to the lower elevations of the Mojave Desert vegetation. Creosote bush (Larrea tridentata), scrub and Joshua tree (Yucca brevifolia) forests grow on the foothills of the mountain while single-leaf pinyon pine (Pinus monophylla), Utah juniper (Juniperus osteosperma), and white fir (Abies concolor) grow on the sky island at the highest elevations.

The high elevation of the mountain means that snow falls on the high peaks during the winter, although the mountain receives little precipitation annually.

Recreation
Clark Mountain is also a world-class rock climbing area developed by Randy Leavitt in 1992. It has been described as containing the best limestone climbing in America and includes the world's first-ever  route, Chris Sharma's Jumbo Love (2008).

See also
 Mojave National Preserve

References

 
 

Mojave National Preserve
Mountains of San Bernardino County, California
Natural history of the Mojave Desert
Mountains of Southern California